The New Jersey Stallions are an American professional Twenty20 franchise cricket team that competes in Minor League Cricket (MiLC). The team is based in Somerset, New Jersey. It was formed in 2020 as part of 24 original teams to compete in Minor League Cricket. The team is co-owned by businessmen Venu Palaparthi and Ravikumar Suri.

The team's home ground is Howe Athletics Complex, located in Somerset, New Jersey. Jasdeep Singh took the helm as captain, with ex-South African player Justin Dill helming vice-captain duties.

Americans Saiteja Mukkamala and Stephen Wiig lead the batting and bowling leaderboards for the team with 367 runs and 27 wickets.

Franchise history

Background 
Talks of an American Twenty20 league started in November 2018 just before USA Cricket became the new governing body of cricket in the United States. In May 2021, USA Cricket announced they had accepted a bid by American Cricket Enterprises (ACE) for a US$1 billion investment covering the league and other investments benefitting the U.S. national teams.

In an Annual General Meeting on February 21, 2020, it was announced that USA Cricket was planning to launch Major League Cricket in 2021 and Minor League Cricket that summer, but it was delayed due to the COVID-19 pandemic and due to the lack of high-quality cricket stadiums in the USA. Major League Cricket was pushed to a summer-2023 launch and Minor League Cricket was pushed back to July 31, 2021.

USA Cricket CEO Iain Higgins also pointed out cities such as New York City, Houston and Los Angeles with a large cricket fanbase, and targeted them among others as launch cities for Minor League Cricket.

Exhibition league 
In July 2020, the player registration for the Minor League Cricket exhibition league began. On August 15, 2020, USA Cricket announced the teams participating in the exhibition league matches, also listing the owners for each team. The draft for the exhibition league began on August 22, 2020, with the New Jersey Stallions releasing their squad on August 24. Nikhil Dutta was later named as captain for the New Jersey Stallions in the exhibition league.

2021 season 

After the conclusion of the exhibition league, USA Cricket announced that they were planning to launch the inaugural season of Minor League Cricket in spring 2021. Ahead of the official season, which was announced to kick off on July 31, they announced Jasdeep Singh as captain and Justin Dill as vice-captain.

In their first match of the season, they defeated the Morrisville Cardinals by 20 runs, and also defeated the Param Veers by 83 runs the following day. They then went on to win against the Titans twice, the Philadelphians, the Hawks, the Yorkers, the Cavaliers twice, and the Eagles twice. They additionally lost against the Hawks, the Yorkers, the Galaxy, and the Ft. Lauderdale Lions. The Stallions topped the group, and qualified for the quarter-finals.

In the quarterfinals, the Stallions swept the Cardinals 2-0 in a best-of-three series, thus qualifying them for the semifinals. In the semifinals, the Stallions faced the Titans, and defeated them by 5 wickets. In the finals, the Silicon Valley Strikers beat the Stallions by 6 wickets in a thriller to take home the trophy.

2022 season 
Ahead of the 2022 season, Major League Cricket announced that the draft for that season would take place on May 12.

Current squad 
 Players with international caps are listed in bold.
  denotes a player who is currently unavailable for selection.
  denotes a player who is unavailable for rest of the season

Statistics

Most runs 

Source: CricClubs, Last updated: 10 March 2022

Most wickets 

Source: CricClubs, Last updated: 10 March 2022

See also 
 2021 Minor League Cricket season
 2021 Minor League Cricket season squads
 2021 Minor League Cricket season final
 Minor League Cricket
 Major League Cricket 
 Houston Hurricanes (cricket)
 Seattle Thunderbolts
 Silicon Valley Strikers
 DC Hawks
 SoCal Lashings

References 

Minor League Cricket teams
Cricket teams in New Jersey
Cricket clubs established in 2020
2020 establishments in New Jersey